is a 2014 Japanese animated historical drama film directed by Mizuho Nishikubo and produced by Production I.G and co-produced and presented by the Japan Association of Music Enterprises. The film was released on February 22, 2014, in Japan and North America on March 22, 2014, in New York International Children's Film Festival. GKIDS has licensed the film for release in North America and will release it on Blu-ray and Digital on February 21, 2023.

The film makes frequent allusions to Kenji Miyazawa's Night on the Galactic Railroad, and borrows the name in its title from that of the book's protagonist.

Plot
The story follows two brothers, Junpei and Kanta, who live on the island of Shikotan, weeks before the end of World War II, on August 15, 1945, Soviet soldiers land on Shikotan and occupy the island. Junpei and Kanta, who live with their grandfather, a fisherman, and their father, the head of the firefighting force of the village, are forced to move to the stables while the Russian commander's family, among them the commander's daughter Tanya, move into the main house. At school, Russian children occupy half the building, and Tanya and the other Russian kids begin to mingle with the Japanese children at recess. After a playground jostle makes Junpei bump into Tanya, they become friends and the two brothers are subsequently invited to Tanya's house for dinner. The brothers' uncle, Hideo, asks Junpei to light signal fires at night so that he can make trips to the main island for rations as they are running low on rice. Meanwhile, their father, Tatsuo, with the help of their school teacher, Sawako, secretly supplies the rest of the village with foodstuff from the Dawn Corps' emergency stores. When Hideo finds out about this, he tries to smuggle the food to sell outside the island, but gets caught instead. Tatsuo rushes to the cave where the Dawn Corps' supplies are kept and gets arrested.

On September 25, 1947, the Japanese on the island are made to assemble at the harbor to be sent back to the mainland. Junpei and Kanta set out with Sawako, while their grandfather chooses to stay behind, determined to spend his last moments on the sea. The three are reunited with Hideo while boarding the ship, and arrive at an internment camp at Maoka, in western Karafuto, a few days later, where they wait for the ship that will take them back to Japan. Hideo finds out that Tatsuo is alive and at another internment camp on the other side of the mountains "just a stone's throw away". Kanta, taking his words literally, sets out to meet his father, aided by Junpei. Sawako and Hideo track the two down the next day, and to Hideo's surprise, Sawako decides to visit Tatsuo's camp as well. The four of them drive to a pillbox where they spend the night, but in the morning they spot Soviet soldiers who've managed to track them down, and Hideo runs ahead as a decoy while Sawako and the children make their escape.

The trio are able to make their way to the internment camp holding Tatsuo, where they have a tearful farewell, with Tatsuo promising he'll find a way to reunite with them no matter what. However, as they try to return, Kanta suddenly falls extremely ill and they are caught by the camp guards. The warden arranges for the trio to be sent back to the harbor by truck, but Kanta succumbs to his illness en route. Junpei and Sawako reunite with Hideo at the harbor where they line up to board the ship back to Japan. Junpei keeps talking to Kanta about the story of the "Night on the Galactic Railroad" to fool the guards into thinking Kanta is still alive so they won't dispose of his body. As he talks, Junpei has a vision of Kanta's spirit riding a ghostly train up into the stars.

56 years later, Sawako and Junpei return to Shikotan and pay their respects at Tatsuo and Kanta's graves. Junpei's school holds a graduation ceremony for those who never managed to have it, and a blonde girl, Tanya's granddaughter, approaches Junpei at dinner. She hands him a notebook, containing one of Junpei's sketches of Tanya, and Junpei gives her his old copy of "Night on the Galactic Railroad" in return. Junpei is saddened to learn that Tanya had died a year earlier. The Russian hosts then begin to play music and the partygoers, both Russian and Japanese, begin to dance. Tanya's granddaughter invites Junpei to dance with her, and the scene morphs to the spirits of Shikotan's original residents dancing with each other among the stars.

Themes 

Giovanni’s island follows these two boys in a roller coaster of emotions focusing on after World War Two. Mainly on the after effects for Japan from losing the war, this small island in the outskirts of Japan was greatly impacted and forced to share schools and houses with foreign conquerors. The theme that the movie is trying to focus on is delivering a message to the audience that even with being in a position of conquest and oppression you can get along when put in the right environment especially for children. The children were forced to combine their schools as the families of the Soviet Union came and colonized the island with the Soviet soldiers. When they first arrived the two mixtures of Japanese and Soviet Union children did not intertwine well but with time they ended up building relationships with another and even became friends at school and embraced one another's culture. National anthems even became normal to sing each other's national anthem at school when they used to be separate and then they sung together. The children started to enjoy each other's company and even the commander of the Soviet Union’s family spent time with Japanese children for dinner.  Giovanni’s island shows the importance of endurance and compassion both were valuable for Junepi and Kanta in friendship with not judging an entire country  based on its action but instead just the person themselves. A prime example of this is the reunion at the end of the film because they all come together for the reunion in peace and harmony even after everything that the Japanese and Russians went through together on that island. Giovanni shows the destiny of people forced in this world where violence lingers, war is inevitable  and language is different but even with all of these issues the movie delivers a clear message that companionship and endurance through hard times can persevere.

Cast
Masachika Ichimura as Tatsuo Senō (瀬能 辰夫 Senō Tatsuo)
Yukie Nakama as Sawako (佐和子)
Kanako Yanagihara as Micchan (みっちゃん Mitchan)
Yūsuke Santamaria as Hideo (英夫)
Kōta Yokoyama as Junpei Senō (瀬能 純平 Senō Junpei)
Junya Taniai as Kanta Senō (瀬能 寛太 Senō Kanta)
Polina Ilyushenko as Tanya (ターニャ Tānya)
Saburo Kitajima as Genzō Senō (瀬能 源三 Senō Genzō)
Hiroshi Inuzuka as Chief
Kaoru Yachigusa as Sawako (Present)
Tatsuya Nakadai as Junpei Senō (Present)

Festival history
 17th New York International Children's Film Festival (2014) / Official Competition
 21st Stuttgart Festival of Animated Film (2014) / AniMovie Competition
 54th Zlin International Film Festival for Children and Youth (2014) / Official Selection
 38th Annecy International Animated Film Festival (2014) / Official Competition
 36th Moscow International Film Festival (2014) / Official Selection
 18th Fantasia International Film Festival (2014) / Official Selection
 18th Puchon International Fantastic Film Festival (2014) / Official Selection
 62nd Melbourne International Film Festival (2014) / Official Selection
 22nd Tokyo Kinder Film Festival (2014) / Official Competition
 4th Sakhalin International Film Festival (2014) / Closing Film
 13th Nueva Mirada Film Festival (2014) / Official Competition
 46th Sitges Film Festival (2014) / Official Competition
 38th Portland International Film Festival (2015) / Official Selection
 13th Imaginaria Film Festival (2015) / Official Selection

Reception
The review aggregator Rotten Tomatoes reported an approval rating of 71%, based on 7 reviews.

Awards
 Jury Distinction, 38th Annecy Animation Film Festival (2014)
 Satoshi Kon Award, 18th Fantasia Film Festival (2014)
 Audience Award, 18th Fantasia Film Festival (2014)
 Jury Special Mention, 13th Nueva Mirada (2014)
 Jury Award, 5th Scotland Loves Animation (2014)
 Children's Jury Prize, 31st Chicago Int'l Children's Film Festival (2014)
 Adult Jury Prize, 31st Chicago Int'l Children's Film Festival (2014)
 Excellence Award, 18th Japan Media Arts Festival (2014)
 Best Animation Film, 69th Mainichi Film Awards (2014)
 Jury Award, 13th Imaginaria Film Festival (2015)

See also
 Kuril Islands dispute

References

External links

2014 films
2014 anime films
2014 war drama films
2010s historical drama films
Animated films about siblings
Films set in 1945
Films set in 1947
Films set in Japan
Films set in the Soviet Union
Historical anime and manga
Japanese historical drama films
Japanese World War II films
2010s Japanese-language films
Kuril Islands
Production I.G
Warner Bros. animated films
Warner Bros. films
Works about children in war